Wasted Youth is the second and final album released by the British glam rock band Girl. Bryson Graham replaced drummer Pete Barnacle during the recording of this album, and contributed to the songwriting process.
A remastered CD was reissued by Rock Candy Records in 2016 complete with a bonus CD of a concert recorded in October 1981.

Track listing
Side one
 "Thru the Twilight" (Phil Collen, Phil Lewis) - 3:25
 "Old Dogs" (Gerry Laffy, Lewis) - 3:40
 "Ice in the Blood" (Bryson Graham) - 3:00
 "Wasted Youth" (G. Laffy, Lewis) - 4:42
 "Standard Romance" (G. Laffy, Lewis) - 3:58

Side two
"Nice 'n' Nasty" (T. Jack) - 3:07
 "McKitty's Back" (Collen, Lewis) - 4:04
 "19" (Collen, G. Laffy, Lewis) - 4:49
 "Overnight Angels" (Collen, G. Laffy, Lewis) - 4:06
 "Sweet Kids" (Collen, Lewis) - 2:33

Personnel
Phil Lewis - vocals
Phil Collen - guitar
Gerry Laffy - guitar
Simon Laffy - bass
Pete Barnacle - credited as a band member but does not play
Bryson Graham - drums

References

Girl (band) albums
1982 albums
New Wave of British Heavy Metal albums
Jet Records albums